Joshua Samuda (born December 23, 1988) is a former American football offensive guard. He played college football at Massachusetts.

College career
He played college football at Massachusetts. During his four years in Massachusetts, He played a total of 45 games. In 2009, he was selected to the 2009 College Sporting News Preseason First-team All-American. He was selected to the 2010 Phil Steele Preseason Second-team All-CAA.

Professional career

Miami Dolphins
On May 4, 2012, he signed with the Miami Dolphins as an Undrafted free agent. He was waived before the first game of the 2013 NFL season.

Minnesota Vikings
On January 3, 2014, he signed with the Minnesota Vikings. He was released on May 13, 2014.

References

External links
Massachusetts bio
Miami Dolphins bio

1988 births
Living people
Samuda, Josh
American football offensive guards
UMass Minutemen football players
Miami Dolphins players
Minnesota Vikings players